Greater Europe refers to the idea of an extended Europe. This generally implies a Europe which transcends traditional geographic boundaries to include trans-Eurasian countries, or countries in close proximity to Continental Europe with strong political, economic, or cultural links to Europe.

Definitions

The concept of Greater Europe may specifically deal with the current enlargement agenda or the potential future enlargement of the European Union.

It may also reference a more "re-unified" Europe following the fall of the Iron Curtain, the intensification of European integration, the potential establishment of a Federal Europe, or to the concept of the Eurosphere and of Europe's increasing global influence. 

Other definitions of Greater Europe may include all European states and CIS countries; or all European states and the Post-Soviet states of the Eurasian Economic Union; theoretically stretching from Lisbon to Vladivostok.

Support

Several organizations exist promoting discussion and debate surrounding Greater Europe, among them the Institute for a Greater Europe and the Youth Association for a Greater Europe. There are also several organizations which promote increased dialogue and greater economic and political integration among states within Greater Europe, including:
Assembly of European Regions
Commonwealth of Independent States
Council of Europe
Eastern Partnership
Euro-Mediterranean Parliamentary Assembly
Euronest Parliamentary Assembly
European Bank for Reconstruction and Development
European Higher Education Area
European Olympic Committees
Mediterranean Union
Organization for Security and Co-operation in Europe
Organization of the Black Sea Economic Cooperation
TRACECA

Economic integration in greater Europe

Lisbon Vladivostok initiative
The vision of a common economic space from Lisbon to Vladivostok has been debated since the 1950s. The Lisbon Vladivostok Initiative believes that this vision can be turned into reality, and sees a multi-level partnership between the European Union (EU) and the Eurasian Economic Union (EAEU) as the core aspect of a common economic space. Cooperation between the EU and EAEU could bring enormous benefits for trade and business in Europe and Eurasia. The Initiative was founded in 2015 and is driven by businesses, business associations, and think tanks from member countries of the EU and EAEU. Among the founding members are the German-Russian Forum, the German Chamber of Commerce, and the German Eastern Business Association, as well as international corporations such as Siemens, Bosch, Severstal and others. Today, the Initiative counts on more than 100 members from 12 countries from the EU and EAEU. It sees itself as an open circle involving all countries from Lisbon to Vladivostok.

Goals of the Lisbon Vladivostok initiative
The markets of the EU and the EAEU cover more than 630 million inhabitants. Despite different levels of development of the two unions, by creating lasting networks between officials, maintaining continual dialogue, and through the establishment of a common economic area in the countries of the EU and the EAEU, it may be possible to combat European and Eurasian issues of the future more effectively.

See also

Eurosphere
European integration
Politics of Europe
Pro-Europeanism
Regions of Europe

References

External links 
 
Greater Europe: Putin's vision of Europe (Dis)integration by Marek Menkiszak

 

Politics of Europe
 
Pan-Europeanism
Pan-European nationalism